Izold Pustõlnik (Изольд Бенционович Пустыльник, Izold Bentsionovich Pustylnik; 17 March 1938 in Odessa, Ukrainian SSR – 2 May 2008 in Tartu, Estonia) was an eminent Estonian astronomer who authored numerous scientific publications and served as editor of the Central European Journal of Physics and vice-chairman of the non-profit organization Euroscience Estonia.

A native of the Ukrainian port city of Odessa (a part of the Soviet Union until 1991), Izold Pustõlnik graduated cum laude from Odessa University in 1960 and received his Ph.D. from the University of Tartu in 1969 and his D.Sc. from Saint Petersburg State University in 1994. From the age of 27 in 1965 until his death forty-three years later, he was on the staff of Tartu Observatory where, as a research associate (promoted to senior research associate in 2000), he worked on the physics of close binary systems, theory of stellar atmospheres, interstellar medium, archaeoastronomy and history of astronomy. He was also a member of the International Astronomical Union, European Astronomical Society, Euroscience, Society for European Astronomy in Culture (SEAC) and served on the board of Euro-Asian Astronomical Society and the advisory board of Astronomical and Astrophysical Transactions.

Izold Pustõlnik died in Tartu eight weeks after his 70th birthday. In 2011 asteroid 11832 (1984 SC6) discovered by Belgian astronomer Henri Debehogne on September 21, 1984 was named after Izold Pustõlnik.

Finally, Izold Pustõlnik is related to Galina Pustylnik, Stan Pustylnik, Irina Pustylnik, Miriam Pustylnik, David Pustylnik, Esther Pustylnik, Olga Farber, Adi Farber, and Noa Farber.

See also 
 Euroscience

References

External links
 Izold Pustõlnik's personal webpage
 List of Izold Pustõlnik's publications
 European Astronomical Society
 Izold Pustõlnik's entry at the Department of Theoretical Physics and Astrophysics Faculty of Science, Masaryk University

1938 births
2008 deaths
Estonian astronomers
Ukrainian astronomers
Members of the Eurasian Astronomical Society
20th-century astronomers
21st-century astronomers
Odesa University alumni
University of Tartu alumni
Scientists from Odesa
People from Tartu